Vincent Charles Castino (October 11, 1917 in Willisville, Illinois – March 6, 1967 in Sacramento, California) was a catcher in Major League Baseball.  He played 88 games and had a career batting average of .228.

External links

 http://www.baseball-almanac.com/players/player.php?p=castivi01
 

1917 births
1967 deaths
Baseball players from Illinois
Major League Baseball catchers
Chicago White Sox players
People from Perry County, Illinois